The Ozone Peak is a French single-place paraglider that was designed by hang gliding and paragliding world champion pilot Robbie Whittall and produced by Ozone Gliders of Le Bar-sur-Loup. It is no longer in production.

Design and development
The Peak was designed as a mountain descent glider. The models are each named for their relative size.

Operational history
Reviewer Noel Bertrand described the Ozone series of gliders in a 2003 review as, "wings that are both pleasant to fly and high performance in their respective categories".

Variants
Peak S
Small-sized model for lighter pilots. The glider model is DHV 1 certified.
Peak M
Mid-sized model for medium-weight pilots. The glider model is DHV 1 certified.
Peak L
Large-sized model for heavier pilots. The glider model is DHV 1 certified.

Specifications (Peak M)

References

External links

Peak
Paragliders